In the mathematical field of low-dimensional topology, the slam-dunk is a particular modification of a given surgery diagram in the 3-sphere for a 3-manifold.  The name, but not the move, is due to Tim Cochran.  Let K be a component of the link in the diagram and J be a component that circles K as a meridian.  Suppose K has integer coefficient n and J has coefficient a rational number r.  Then we can obtain a new diagram by deleting J and changing the coefficient of K to n-1/r.  This is the slam-dunk.

The name of the move is suggested by the proof that these diagrams give the same 3-manifold.  First, do the surgery on K, replacing a tubular neighborhood of K by another solid torus T according to the surgery coefficient n.  Since J is a meridian, it can be pushed, or "slam dunked", into T.  Since n is an integer, J intersects the meridian of T once, and so J must be isotopic to a longitude of T.  Thus when we now do surgery on J, we can think of it as replacing T by another solid torus.  This replacement, as shown by a simple calculation, is given by coefficient n - 1/r.

The inverse of the slam-dunk can be used to change any rational surgery diagram into an integer one, i.e. a surgery diagram on a framed link.

References
 Robert Gompf and Andras Stipsicz, 4-Manifolds and Kirby Calculus, (1999) (Volume 20 in Graduate Studies in Mathematics), American Mathematical Society, Providence, RI 

Geometric topology